Jelly baby, Jellie babies or other variants of the same name may refer to 

 Jelly Babies - a type of gelatine based sweets (candies) popular since the 19th century in Britain
 Screaming jelly babies -  a popular chemistry experiment demonstrating oxidation reactions.
 Jelly baby - Leotia lubrica a type of  small woodland fungus which has some resemblance to the gelatinous British sweet (see above)